Koninklijke Football Club Lommelse Sportkring was a Belgian football club that existed between 1932 and 2003.  It played two spells at the highest level in the Belgian football league system:  from 1992 to 2000 and from 2001 to 2003.  Its best ranking was reached in 1997 when it finished 5th.

History
The club was founded in 1932 when most players of the neighbour Lommelsche V.V. (first named Lommelsche S.K.) created this club, as the former ended its activity at the beginning of the season.  It became a member of the Belgian Football Association the same year, and eventually received the matricule n°1986. In 1947, the name of the club changed to Lommelse S.K., and then to K.F.C. Lommel S.K. in 1968.

Lommel first appeared in the second division in 1987 and won the competition in 1992, two years after a third place in the second division final round.  It played one more season at that level in 2000–01 to win this league again.  In 2003, the club fell victim to the Commission des Licences new regulations regarding debt – the club owed several thousand euro to the Belgian FA and was unable to pay this on time. The entire first-team squad left in the face of imminent liquidation of the club. The team attempted to continue by playing its youth team but three matchdays before the end of the 2002–03 season, Lommel – still able to avoid relegation on the field – were expelled from the Jupiler League.  The FA decided to erase all results involving Lommel in the first division and the final table did not include the club.  The matricule 1986 disappears. Member of former club board's took contact with K.V.V. Overpelt Fabriek a club wearing the matricule n°2554 of a neighbour town.

References
 Pluto website – Belgian football clubs history
 RSSSF Archive – 1st and 2nd division final tables

Association football clubs established in 1932
Association football clubs disestablished in 2003
Defunct football clubs in Belgium
1932 establishments in Belgium
2003 disestablishments in Belgium
Organisations based in Belgium with royal patronage
K.F.C. Lommel S.K.
Belgian Pro League clubs
Sport in Limburg (Belgium)